XHPRS-FM (105.7 MHz) is a commercial FM radio station transmitting from Tecate, Baja California, Mexico, and serving the San Diego–Tijuana metropolitan area. The station's signal is owned and operated by Media Sports de México (itself owned by Mexican businessman Jaime Bonilla Valdez). The Transmitter is located on Cerro Bolla.

The station is currently stunting as a classic alternative radio station that is branded as "105.7 Willy FM".

History

The concession history for XHPRS begins in Ensenada, Baja California, where the concession for XHBCE-FM was awarded to Gustavo Adolfo Paez y Vejar on November 16, 1988. In the early 2000s, under Roxana Alexanderson Torres, XHBCE began its move into the Tijuana area by soliciting a move to Cerro Grande to the east of Ensenada, coinciding with the station's change to 105.7 MHz, and then to Cerro Bola in Tecate. (XHHC-FM would later restore the 92.1 frequency to use in Ensenada.) By 2005, XHBCE was broadcasting a Spanish-language talk format known as La Pantera, embroiled in an interference dispute with KXRS in Hemet, California that threatened to cut off the station's access to programming delivered from the United States under FCC authorization.

From 2006 to 2008, this station simulcast XEPRS-AM as XX (pronounced Double X) Sports Radio. It aired San Diego Padres games and the entire talk show lineup from the AM station.  Before that, it had various musical formats. When XX Sports Radio aired on FM, it helped spread the XEPRS signal to eastern parts of San Diego County. On April 15, 2008, the station broke away from the simulcast, and flipped to oldies/classic hits, branded as "105.7 the Walrus." In May 2008, it received authorization to change its callsign to XHPRS-FM, though it had been using the callsign for some time before.

In May 2014, while promoting their "105 Walrus Days Of Summer", the station began playing fewer songs from the late 1960s and early 1970s while adding more 1980s hits and de-emphasizing the "Walrus" name. Morning co-host John Nolan left the station in July, leaving Kim Morrison to do the show solo. Afternoon host Rich "Brother" Robbin left in August. On August 18, 2014, XHPRS became Max FM, playing classic hits from the mid-1970s through the early 1990s. Jack Diamond became the new morning show co-host. Prior to a 23-year run at WRQX in Washington, D.C., Diamond had done mornings at country-formatted KSON. After one week at XHPRS, Diamond returned to Washington. Once again, Kim Morrison would host the morning show solo. Christina Martinez, formerly at KRTO in Guadalupe, California, hosts afternoons.

On December 12, 2018, the station's Max FM programming, as well as that of sister station XEPE-AM, was taken off-air due to a payment dispute between the station's ownership and Broadcast Company of the Americas. XHPRS's over-the-air transmitter is currently carrying classic alternative rock programming, initially "nameless" but later branded as 105.7 Willy FM. There is no imaging or advertising, outside of required Mexican political commercials. Despite being dropped from XHPRS, BCA continued to operate Max FM as an Internet radio station, but began laying off the station's airstaff in January. On February 28, 2019, BCA announced that the Max FM intellectual unit would cease operations. As of early 2020, there are Facebook and Twitter pages for "105.7 Willy FM" with a logo but no content.

References

External links

1988 establishments in Mexico
Radio stations established in 1988
Mass media in Tecate
Radio stations in Baja California
Classic rock radio stations